Rocamadour is a French cheese from the southwest part of the country. It is produced in the regions of Périgord and Quercy and takes its name from the village of Rocamadour in the département of the Lot. 

Rocamadour belongs to a family of goat cheeses called Cabécous and has benefited from being accorded an AOC (appellation d'origine contrôlée) designation since 1996.  It is a very small whitish cheese (average weight 35 g) with a flat round shape (see illustration).

Rocamadour is usually sold very young after just 12-15 days of aging and is customarily consumed on hot toast or in salads. Rocamadour can be aged further. After several months it takes on a more intense flavor and is typically eaten on its own with a red wine toward the end of the meal.

Production: 546 tonnes in 1998 (+24.1% since 1996), 100% with raw, unpasteurized goat milk (50% on farms).

See also
 List of goat milk cheeses

References

External links

 Cahier des charges AOP de l'appellation rocamadour enregistré à la Commission européenne 
 Site du syndicat des producteurs de fromages Rocamadour, consulté le 30 janvier 2010.
 Rocamadour, site des fromages AOP

French cheeses
Occitan cheeses
French products with protected designation of origin
Goat's-milk cheeses
Cheeses with designation of origin protected in the European Union